Promnice  is a village in the administrative district of Gmina Czerwonak, within Poznań County, Greater Poland Voivodeship, in west-central Poland. The village has a population of 450.

Just to the west of Promnice is a road bridge crossing the Warta river, on the road between Bolechowo and Biedrusko. The village stretches mainly northwards from that road, adjoining the settlement of Złotoryjsko to the north.

References

Promnice